Arwa (born Iman Salem Ba'amiran; July 8, 1979) is a Yemeni-Egyptian singer and television host.

At the age of ten, her family moved to Cairo where she later received her education at Cairo University studying engineering. She began her singing career in 1999 and has released four albums.

In 2009, Arwa became host for an entertainment television show called Akher Man Ya'lam (The Last To Know). The first episode was aired on September 27, 2009, on MBC 1. In 2010, she received a Golden Award for her television show at the "Khalij" radio and television festival.

Discography
 1999 Ragaak Waqtak 
 2001 Arwa 2
 2003 Ahla Ayami
 2006 Inta Arafane
 2009 Ghasseb Aannak
 2014 Ya Moumayyaz
 2018 Omy Alyemen

References

https://arwaonline.com/ Official Website

External links

1979 births
Living people
Kuwaiti emigrants to Egypt
Yemeni emigrants to Egypt
Cairo University alumni
Yemeni women singers
People from Kuwait City
Yemeni people of Egyptian descent
21st-century Yemeni women
20th-century Yemeni women
21st-century women singers
Singers who perform in Egyptian Arabic
21st-century Yemeni women singers
20th-century Yemeni women singers